Professor John Hope  (10 May 1725 – 10 November 1786) was a Scottish physician and botanist. He did enormous work on plant classification and plant physiology, and is now best known as an early supporter of Carl Linnaeus's system of classification. He did not publish much.

In 1783 he was a joint founder of the Royal Society of Edinburgh.

In 1784 Hope was elected as president of the Royal College of Physicians of Edinburgh (1784–6).

Early life
Born in Edinburgh on 10 May 1725, John Hope was the son of surgeon Robert Hope and Marion Glas, and a grandson of Archibald Hope, Lord Rankeillor, a Senator of the College of Justice who was in turn the son of Sir John Hope, 2nd Baronet.  He was the great-grandson of Sir Thomas Hope, 1st Baronet.

He was educated at Dalkeith Grammar School, then studied medicine at the University of Edinburgh. He took leave to study botany under Bernard de Jussieu at the University of Paris, but returned to his studies in Scotland, graduating MD from the University of Glasgow in 1750.

For the next decade he practiced medicine, indulging in botany in his spare time. With the death of Charles Alston in 1760, he succeeded him as the 4th Regius Keeper of the Royal Botanic Garden Edinburgh and King's Botanist and as Professor of Botany and Materia Medica at the University of Edinburgh. However Hope saw his responsibility for materia medica as a threat to his work in botany, and therefore arranged for the chair to be split: Hope became Professor of Medicine and Botany, and a separate chair of Materia Medica are created.

In 1763, Hope succeeding in promoting the idea of combining the gardens and collections at Trinity Hospital and Holyrood to a new, combined site on Leith Walk to the north. Transfer of plants took several years and the old gardens closed in 1770.In the spring of 1689, for certain strategic military reasons, the Nor Loch which lay west of the Physic Garden was drained, resulting in the flooding of the garden, with much mud and general rubbish being deposited, to the ruination of many of the plants. He also succeeded in obtaining a permanent endowment for the garden, thus establishing arguably the first ever "Royal Botanic Garden". Though he published only a few papers, and is therefore little remembered as a botanist, he made many early physiological experiments. These informed his teaching, but were not published, and were only discovered in his unpublished manuscripts many years after his death. He was elected a Fellow of the Royal Society in February 1767. He was appointed Physician in Ordinary to the Royal Infirmary of Edinburgh in 1768. In 1774 he was elected a member of the Aesculapian Club.

In later life he lived at High School Yards on the southern edge of the Old Town.

He died in Edinburgh on 10 November 1786, and was interred at Greyfriars Kirkyard.

Botanical Reference
The genus Hopea is named after Hope.

Bibliography 
  (Deals with Rheum palmatum)

Family
He was married to Juliana Stevenson, sister of Dr Alexander Stevenson, also a joint founder of the Royal Society of Edinburgh.

The couple had the following children:
Robert Hope
Marianne Hope, d. 1837, married James Walker, Esq.
Major John Hope, (1765-1840)
Thomas Charles Hope, FRSE, (1766-1844)
James Hope WS, (1769-1842)

His grandson, John Hope WS (1807-1893) was a noted campaigner and philanthropist who founded the Hope Trust.

Secondary sources 
  (digital edition in Internet Archive: one hour lending); new edition by Henri J. Noltie, 2011

References 

Scottish botanists
Plant physiologists
Scottish surgeons
1725 births
1786 deaths
Founder Fellows of the Royal Society of Edinburgh
Fellows of the Royal College of Physicians of Edinburgh
Presidents of the Royal College of Physicians of Edinburgh
Fellows of the Royal Society
Members of the Philosophical Society of Edinburgh
John
Alumni of the University of Edinburgh
People from Dalkeith
Medical doctors from Edinburgh
Burials at Greyfriars Kirkyard
18th-century British botanists
18th-century Scottish medical doctors
Scientists from Edinburgh